The Alvan Ikoku Federal College of Education, Owerri  is located in Owerri, the capital of Imo State, Nigeria. It was established in April, 1963 as the Advanced Teachers Training College by the defunct Eastern Nigeria Government on the grounds of the Old Shell Camp, Owerri.  It has since  expanded across the Orlu Road on the Nworie River. It awards the National Certificate in Education (NCE) and the Professional Diploma in Education (PDE) and, in affiliation, with the University of Nigeria, Nsukka  the Bachelor of Education (B.Ed) since 1984. The Provost is Dr. (Mrs.) Stella Ngozi Lemchi. She took over, in 2022, from Dr. Dan C. Anyanwu. Dr (Mrs.) Lemchi is the second female Provost of the College, after Professor Blessing C. Ijioma.

History

The College was founded in 1963 as the Advanced Teachers Training College with technical assistance from UNESCO. It was charged with the responsibility of training teachers in line with the Ashby report on Higher Education in Nigeria. In 1973, via Edict No. 11 promulgated by the Administrator of East-Central State of Nigeria, Ukpabi Asika, the Teachers College became a College of Education and was named Alvan Ikoku in honour of Alvan Ikoku, a teacher and educationist, founder of the first African owned secondary school in Nigeria (Aggrey Memorial Grammar School) and President of the Nigerian Union of Teachers (NUT) for many years.

The College started with 150 students and by 2012 the student population had grown to over 13,000, with over 600 academic staff. The students include regular undergraduates, sandwich course students, evening and weekend students and post-graduates studying the Professional Diploma in Education. In 1976, a campus of the College catering to the Department of Agriculture was established in Umuahia, now the capital of Abia State. Next was the establishment of an Orlu campus in 1981, but the multi-campus system was ended in 1987 and the college reverted to a single campus institution.

In 2007, the Federal Government took over the college and it metamorphosed into Alvan Ikoku Federal College of Education, Owerri. The Federal Government take-over brought improved financial aid and the College has become able to renovate old structures, build large classrooms, laboratories and hostels and expanded the staff strength.  It also enabled the College to start new departments and Schools and establish new ventures.  On May 20, 2015, the Federal Government of Nigeria under President Goodluck Jonathan upgraded the school to a full fledged university to be called Alvan Ikoku University of Education. However, a few months later, the Muhammadu Buhari administration put the upgrade "on hold."

The College is styled primus inter pares, first among equals in Colleges of Education in Nigeria, because of its outstanding impact in the teacher education sector in Nigeria. It is envisioned as a modern Federal University of Education in a clean and healthy environment, that is a centre for excellence in ICT research, whose graduates are well adjusted and functional individuals.

Schools

The College has seven Schools which include the:

 School of Vocational and Technical Education
 School of Languages
 School of General Education
 School of Sciences
 School of Arts and Social Sciences
 School of General Studies
School of Early Childhood Care and Primary Education

Principals/Provosts

 Mr. A. J. Brooks 
 Mr. J. O. Wachukwu (1970)
 Mr. John Munonye (1970–1974)
 Prof. B. O. Ukeje (First Provost: 1974 – 1980)
 Prof. S. N. Nwosu (1980 – 1985)
 Prof. N. A Nwagwu (1986 – 1992)
 Prof. E. N. Emenyonu (1992 – 1995)
 Dr. Dan Onwukwe (Acting: 1995)
 Prof. A. E. Afigbo (Sole Administrator: 1996 – 1997)
 Prof. L. E Amadi (1997 – 1999)
 Dr. Dan Onwukwe (1999 – 2004)
 Prof. Ngozi Uwazurike (2004 – 2009)
 Dr. H. C. Amadi (Acting: 2009 – 2010)
 Prof. (Mrs.) Blessing C. Ijioma (2010 – 2017)
 Dr. Dan C. Anyanwu (2017 – 2022)
 Dr. (Mrs.) Stella N. Lemchi (2022 - Date)

Academics

The establishment of the Alvan Ikoku Federal College of Education, Owerri in 1963, just three years after Nigeria’s independence was a milestone in the annals of education in Nigeria, especially the South-East. As an institution solely disposed to research, teaching and training teachers for both the intermediate and higher education sectors, the College has in the past fifty years contributed to the production of quality teachers in the country. In 1984, the College became affiliated with the University of Nigeria, Nsukka to award the bachelor's degree in various subject areas.

The College houses the students in hostels named alphabetically from A-G. The College has students from all over the country and several countries from West Africa, especially the Spanish speaking countries whose citizens come to study English at the International Centre for English Studies (ICES). The College has a predominantly female student population with females making up over 80%. Consequently, the female volleyball team is one of the strongest in the Collegiate games in the country, consistently winning gold or silver in the Nigerian College of Education Games (NICEGA).

The Sandwich Programme caters for people pursuing a teaching career who want to improve their education. These students study during the holidays when the full-time Regular undergraduate students have dispersed and primary and secondary schools are on break. The Sandwich system has enabled many teachers to get the relevant credentials to progress in the teaching profession. The students have a Student Union Government (SUG) led by an elected President and a Students Representative Council (SRC), a body of elected student legislators. In spite of the dominant female population, the SUG Presidents have been males, except for 2019-2020 academic session when Comrade Ugonna Gloria Alozie won the Presidency.

The College runs demonstration centres. They are Department of Early Childhood Care Kindergarten/Nursery School, Department of Primary Education School and the School of Education Demonstration Secondary School. The Primary School was set up in 1983 and the Secondary School started in October, 1994.The demonstration centres were established to help teachers and students carry out their teaching practice activities, a major requirement for graduation, and to solve the educational needs of the staff and general public by providing professionally run schools at the three levels.

References 

Federal colleges of education in Nigeria
Owerri
Educational institutions established in 1963
1963 establishments in Nigeria
Education in Imo State